The Portland Pilots men's soccer team represents the University of Portland in NCAA Division I men's soccer competitions.

Honors 
 WCC Regular Season
 Winners (6): 1988, 1989, 1990, 1992, 2002, 2016

Notable alumni 
 Kasey Keller
 Joey Leonetti
 Steve Cherundolo
 Heath Pearce
 Conor Casey
 Nate Jaqua
 Collen Warner
 Logan Emory
 Mark Miller
 Greg Maas
 Scott Benedetti
 Ian McLean
 Wade Webber
 Luis Robles
 Josh Simpson
 Benji Michel
 Noah Beck

References

External links 
Portland Pilots Men's Soccer

 
Men's
Pilots